The Anya and Andrew Shiva Art Gallery is the primary fine art gallery at John Jay College of Criminal Justice, a senior college of the City University of New York in Hell's Kitchen, Manhattan, New York City. The exhibitions feature a variety of media, but are heavily focused on social issues and the humanities. The exhibits in 2012 showed works on social justice, and 2013 exhibits showed works on women in social justice.

Opened in 2013, the gallery is 4,050 square feet and is on the ground floor of John Jay's 620,000-square foot building that sits on 11th Avenue and 59th Street (524 West 59th Street) in New York City, a four block walk from Central Park. The building was designed by Owings and Merrill.

The building and Gallery were made possible by the biggest donation the school had ever received, and the main donors, when asked why they wanted an art gallery, simply responded 'an art gallery provides our students with exposure to art, creativity, imagination, and inspiration.'

References

59th Street (Manhattan)
Art museums and galleries in Manhattan
Eleventh Avenue (Manhattan)
Hell's Kitchen, Manhattan
John Jay College of Criminal Justice
University art museums and galleries in New York City